Aadi Dampatulu is a 1986 Telugu-language drama film, produced by Nitin D. Kapoor under the JSK Combines banner and directed by Dasari Narayana Rao. It stars Akkineni Nageswara Rao, Jayasudha  and music composed by Satyam. The film is a remake of the Hindi movie Ghar Dwaar (1985).

Plot
The film begins with Shankar Rao & Parvathi being the perfect couple, Shankar Rao has two brothers Mohan & Sagar, and a sister Kamala to raise them the pair decides not to have children of their own. Shankar Rao wants his brothers should be well educated, so, he works hard day & night for their development. Looking at it, the younger one Sagar feigns illness and makes Mohan an engineer. Eventually, Mohan loves and marries Uma daughter of a multi-millionaire Sulochana Devi. Soon after, vainglory Uma, hostiles with the family members and swears to exact avenge by destroying their happiness. It works on each family member by separating them and spoiling the relationship. Right now, Uma departs to her mother's house along with Mohan where he is humiliated, so, he leaves the place and reaches Dubai to earn money. Sagar also leaves the house because of insults made by Uma. On the other side, Shankar Rao has to sacrifice his job and home to perform Kamala's marriage with her love interest Bujji. Parallelly, society criticizes Uma when she realizes her mistake and moves for Mohan. On the way, she is attacked by goons when Sagar rescues her. At the same time, Mohan returns, and all of them go in search of Shankar Rao & Parvathi. By that time, the couple is terminally-ill. In the climax, both die together showing they are immortal.

Cast
Akkineni Nageswara Rao as Shankar Rao
Jayasudha as Parvathi
Dasari Narayana Rao as Collector D. N. Rao
Chandra Mohan as Mohan
Naresh as Sagar
Gollapudi Maruthi Rao as  Dharma Rao
Suthi Velu
Tilak as Bujji
Tulasi as Uma
Poornima as Kamala
Raja Sulochana as Sulochana Devi
Jaya Malini as item number
Master Harish as Young Shankar Rao

Crew
Art: Chalam
Choreography: Raghu, Dhanush, Taara
Lyrics: Sirivennela Seetharama Sastry, Appalacharya, Dasari Narayana Rao, Gurram Jashuva, Kondaveeti Venkatakavi
Playback: S. P. Balasubrahmanyam, K. J. Yesudas, P. Susheela, Vani Jayaram, Madhavpeddi Ramesh, Manjula
Music: Chellapilla Satyam
Story: Keshav Rathod, Bhishetty Lakshmana Rao
Editing: B. Krishnam Raju
Cinematography: P. S. Selvaraj 
Producer: Nitin D. Kapoor
Dialogues - Screenplay - Director: Dasari Narayana Rao 
Banner: JSK Combines
Release Date: 20 June 1986

Soundtrack

Soundtrack composed by Chellapilla Satyam was released through SEA Records music label.

References

External links

Indian drama films
Telugu remakes of Hindi films
Films directed by Dasari Narayana Rao
Films scored by Satyam (composer)
1980s Telugu-language films
1986 drama films
1986 films